Nischintapur railway station is a Kolkata Suburban Railway station on the main line. It is under the jurisdiction of the Sealdah railway division in the Eastern Railway zone of the Indian Railways. Nischintapur railway station is situated at Sitarampur, Nischintapur, South 24 Parganas district in the Indian state of West Bengal.

History

Electrification

Station complex
The platform is well sheltered. The station possesses many facilities including water and sanitation. It is well connected to the NH-12. There is a proper approach road to this station.

References

Railway stations in South 24 Parganas district
Sealdah railway division
Kolkata Suburban Railway stations
Railway stations in India opened in 2001
2001 establishments in West Bengal